The 2012 Campeonato Catarinense - Divisão Principal was the 89th season of Santa Catarina's top professional football league. The competition began on 22 January and ended on 25 May. Avaí was the champion after win the two matches at finals against Figueirense.

Format
First stage
 All ten teams play a round-robin playing once against each other team.
 The top 4 teams qualify for the semi-finals which are played 1st vs 4th and 2nd vs 3rd. Where games are tied the higher placed team progresses. The final is played at the ground of the higher placed team and, as in the semi-final, in a tied game the higher placed team wins.

Second stage
 All ten teams play a round-robin playing once against each other team.
 The top 4 teams qualify for the semi-finals which are played 1st vs 4th and 2nd vs 3rd. Where games are tied the higher placed team progresses. The final is played at the ground of the higher placed team and, as in the semi-final, in a tied game the higher placed team wins.

Finals
 Home-and-away playoffs between the winners of the first and second stages.
 The winner of the Finals is crowned champion.

Stadia and locations

First phase

First stage

Second stage

Final standings

Knockout phase

Semi-finals

|}

Finals

|}

Overall classification

References

External links
 Official Site

2012
Catarinense